is a Japanese football player. He plays for Yokohama FC.

Career
Kosuke Saito joined J2 League club Yokohama FC in 2016.

Club statistics
Updated to 1 March 2019.

References

External links
Profile at Yokohama FC

1997 births
Living people
Association football people from Kanagawa Prefecture
Japanese footballers
J1 League players
J2 League players
Yokohama FC players
Association football forwards